The Institute is a 1983 graphic adventure game released for the TRS-80, Commodore 64, and Atari 8-bit family by Screenplay.

Gameplay
The user navigates their character through a graph of rooms by entering commands with the keyboard: "N", "W", "S", and "E" are used to move respectively north, west, south, and east; simple text commands to interact and investigate objects within the rooms such as "open door" are also used.

The game's protagonist is a mental patient trying to escape from the institute (hence the title). A good deal of the game takes place in drug-induced hallucinations, though in some versions the drug is a "strange powder" that sends you into "dreams."

External links
Background from Ye Olde Infocomme Shoppe
Review from Antic Vol. 3 No. 7
Stephan's Retrocomputing Site (contains solution)

1983 video games
Commodore 64 games
Adventure games
Atari 8-bit family games
TRS-80 games
Video games developed in the United States